The 21st Shanghai Television Festival ceremony was held in Shanghai, China on June 12, 2015.

Winners and nominees

References

External links
 List of Nominees 

Shanghai Television Festival
2015 television awards
2015 in Chinese television